The In the Margins Award, established in 2013, is an annual literary award presented to fiction and nonfiction "self published books by, for and about people of color living in the margins." The primary audience of the books is generally individuals aged 9-21 who are Black, Indigenous People of Color; "youth from a street culture," "youth in restrictive custody," and/or "youth who are reluctant readers."

The In the Margins Award was established as part of the Library Services for Youth in Custody but since 2017, has operated independently.

Recipients

References 

Awards established in 2013
American literary awards